Herman Herbers (Groenlo, 1540 or 1544- Gouda, February 23 1607) was a Dutch pastor and theologian.

Biography 
Herbers was born in Groenlo in 1540 or 1544 as the son of Roman Catholic parents. He was educated in a monastery. He joined the Mariengarden Monastery of the order of the Cistercians in Gross-Burlo, near Winterswijk. 

In 1566 he was appointed deputy to the pastor of Winterswijk, who died to the plague. Herbers developed sympathy for the ideas of Erasmus and for Protestantism. He settled in Bocholt, Germany, where a Protestant-friendly climate prevailed. Herbers married Ermken Dircks Raesveltsdr.

He was appointed preacher of the new doctrine in 1569, but was deposed in 1570 by the bishop of Münster and Osnabrück. Despite the support that Herbers received from the city council and the population, he was expelled from the diocese.

Herbers then established himself as a Lutheran minister in Wesel where he wrote a creed. In 1577 he accepted an appeal to the Reformed Churches in Dordrecht. Already during his ministry of Dordrecht, he was loaned to other cities including Antwerp, Gouda and Mechelen. Gradually, Herbers developed into an open-minded pastor, who developed an understanding for dissenters. This brought him into conflict with both the local authorities in Dordrecht and the church council. He was dismissed as a preacher by the city council of Dordrecht in 1582. He was also not issued a certificate to his new municipality of Gouda. 

Despite this lack of cooperation by the Dordrecht authorities, he was received with open arms in Gouda by the Gouda city council and the church council there. Herbers is said to be Pastor of Gouda for a period of 25 years. He was given the opportunity to put his non-conformist views into practice. Despite objections from the ecclesiastical authorities, Herbers refused to teach the catechism. 

From 1591 to 1593, Herbers was declared suspended by the synod, but nevertheless maintained by the Gouda authorities as pastor of the Sint-Janskerk. Herbers' religious views were echoed in Gouda, among other things, in the work of his son the preacher Dirck Herbers and the preachers Harboldus Tombergen and Eduard Poppius. 

They were followers of Jacobus Arminius and in 1610 co-signatories of the Remonstrance. Herbers is considered one of the Arminian forerunners of the Remonstrants. His writings testify also to a mystical or experimental experience of faith. He died in February 1607 at the age of 66 in Gouda.

Works 
Herbers and his son Dirck are also seen as the co-authors of :

 Short education of the children in the Christian religion
 The so-called
 De Goudse Catechismus
 A textbook for the youth

Notes and references

Citations

Sources

Further reading 
 Anoniem, Korte onderwijsinghe der kinderen in de christelijcke religie, uitg. J. Migoen, Gouda, 1607
 Teghen-bericht, gestelt tegens een seecker boecxken geintituleert, Cort ende waerachtich verhael etc., welcks wt den naeme van den Zuyt-Hollandischen Synodo onlangs teghen hem wtghegheven is: alles tot een vry oordeel van alle godmeynende, uitg. D. Mullem, Rotterdam, 1592
 Antwoort op verscheyden obiectien ofte tegenworpingen betreffende den artyckel van die eewige predestinatie, ofte voorschickinghe Gods, waer mede bewesen wart, dat niemant door Gods voorordeninghe tot desselvighen haet ofte tot den doot ende verdoemenisse comt, maer alleene door zijn selfs boosheyt ofte sonde, uitg. D. Mullem, Rotterdam, 1592
 Naerder verklaringhe over XXXII. articulen, welcke Caspar Zwerinckhuysen ... wt die ghedruckte schriften desselvighen Hermanni getrocken, ende in een missive aen ettelicke Vlaemsche mannen (woonachtich binnen der Goude) overgheschreven heeft, [uitg. Dirck Mullem, Rotterdam], 1592
 Bekentenisse des gheloofs, uitg. Jan Zas Hoensz, Gouda, 1591
 Vande eeuwige predestinatie ofte voor-schickinge Godes, circa 1590
 Een corte ende grondige verclaringe vanden Anti-christ, uitg. Dierick Mullem, Vianen, 1584
 Corte verclaringhe over die woorden Pauli, geschreven tot den Romeynen cap. 2, vers 28, uitg. Dierick Mullem, Vianen, 1584

External links 
 Herman Herbers (1540-1607)

1540 births
1607 deaths
17th-century Dutch theologians
17th-century Protestant religious leaders
Arminian ministers
Arminian theologians
Remonstrants
Year of birth uncertain